Elżbieta Kępińska (born 5 April 1937) is a Polish film actress. She has appeared in more than 20 films and television shows since 1960, including Samson (1961), Grzech Antoniego Grudy (1975) and Dotkniecie nocy (1962). She was married to Polish communist politician Mieczysław Rakowski until his death in 2008.

Selected filmography
 Tonight a City Will Die (1961)
 Samson (1961)
 Everything for Sale (1969)

References

External links

1937 births
Living people
Polish film actresses
People from Częstochowa
Polish television actresses
20th-century Polish actresses
21st-century Polish actresses